Clontarf railway station was a railway station in Dublin, Ireland, on the Dublin and Drogheda Railway line.

Location
The remnants of the station can still be seen at the rail bridge over Howth Road, halfway between the start of that road and Killester village centre, approximately one kilometre north of the present Clontarf Road railway station.

The station was opened on 25 May 1844 and finally closed on 3 September 1956.

References

Disused railway stations in County Dublin
Railway stations in the Republic of Ireland opened in 1844
Railway stations in Ireland closed in 1956
1944 establishments in Ireland
1956 disestablishments in Ireland
Railway stations in the Republic of Ireland opened in the 20th century